Ajit Singh (IPS) (10 October 1945 -  7 May 1991)  was an Indian Police Service officer who was killed in an encounter with militants in 1991 in Punjab, India. A 1968 batch officer, he was Deputy Inspector General of Police, Border Range, Amritsar at the time of his death.
Ajit Singh served in Indian Army before joining Indian Police Services. He was awarded Vir Chakra.

His younger son Ajinder Singh (PPS) is also serving as a senior official in Punjab Police as Superintendent of Police. Ajinder Singh has done some notable work in Gurdaspur, SAS Nagar, Patiala, Fatehgarh, Ropar, Ludhiana and Information Technology cell of Punjab Police.

References

1945 births
1991 deaths
Indian Police Service officers
Indian police officers killed in the line of duty
Indian Sikhs
Assassinated Indian people
Male murder victims
Victims of the insurgency in Punjab
Deaths by firearm in India
Assassinated police officers
People murdered in Punjab, India
Victims of Sikh terrorism
1991 murders in India